Saint Irene of Rome (died 288 AD) was a Christian woman in the Roman Empire during the reign of Diocletian. She was the wife of Saint Castulus. According to Christian legend, she attended to Saint Sebastian after he was wounded by Mauretanian archers.

Biography 

Irene was the wife of Saint Castulus who, according to tradition, was in the service of the Roman emperor. She was later widowed when Castulus was martyred for practicing Christianity and converting others to the religion. After the death of her husband, Irene continued to be active in the Christian community in Rome. According to hagiography, when Saint Sebastian was shot with arrows for practicing Christianity, Irene tended his wounds.

Saint Sebastian Tended by Saint Irene was the subject of many paintings by Benedetto Luti and others.

Gallery

References 

288 deaths
3rd-century Christian martyrs
Late Ancient Christian female saints
Italian Roman Catholic saints
Saints from Roman Italy
Year of birth unknown